25th Hour is a 2002 American drama film directed by Spike Lee and starring Edward Norton. Adapted by David Benioff from his own 2001 debut novel The 25th Hour, it tells the story of a man's last 24 hours of freedom as he prepares to go to prison for seven years for dealing drugs.

25th Hour opened to positive reviews, with several critics since having named it one of the best films of its decade and praising it for its portrayal of New York City after the September 11 attacks.

Plot
A car pulls up on a New York City street, which Monty Brogan exits with his friend Kostya to look at an injured dog lying in the road. Monty intends to perform a mercy kill and shoot him, but changes his mind after he looks it in the eye; he takes the dog to a nearby clinic instead.

A few years later, Monty is about to begin serving a seven-year prison sentence for dealing drugs. He sits in a park with Doyle, the dog he rescued, on his last day of freedom. He plans to meet childhood friends Frank, a boorish Wall Street trader, and Jacob, an introverted high school teacher with a crush on his student Mary, at a club with his girlfriend Naturelle.

Monty visits his father, James, a former firefighter and recovering alcoholic at his bar, to confirm their plans to drive to the prison the following morning. James was able to establish the bar with Monty’s drug money, and remorsefully sneaks a drink when Monty goes to the bathroom. Facing himself in the mirror, Monty lashes out in his mind against everyone in New York before finally turning on himself, angry for becoming greedy and not giving up drug dealing before he was caught.

In a flashback, Monty remembers the night he was arrested: DEA agents raided Monty's apartment and quickly found the drugs he was selling for Uncle Nikolai, a Russian mobster. Kostya tries to persuade Monty it was Naturelle who betrayed him, since she knew where he hid his drugs and money. Monty refused to turn state's evidence against Nikolai, but is unsure about Nikolai’s actions. Monty remembers how he met Naturelle hanging around his old school, and how happy they were. He then asks Frank to find out if it was Naturelle who betrayed him.

Jacob sees Mary outside the club, and Monty invites her inside with them. Discussing what kind of a future Monty can have after prison, Frank says they can open a bar together, even though he told Jacob that he believes Monty deserves his sentence for dealing drugs. Frank accuses Naturelle of living high on Monty's money despite knowing its origins, but she retorts that Frank also knew but said nothing. The argument culminates with Frank insulting Naturelle's ethnicity, followed by her slapping Frank and leaving. Jacob, meanwhile, finds the courage to kiss Mary, but both are shocked afterwards and go their separate ways.

Monty and Kostya go to see Nikolai, who gives Monty advice on surviving in prison. Nikolai then reveals it was Kostya who betrayed Monty, and offers him a chance to kill Kostya in exchange for protecting his father's bar. Monty refuses, reminding Nikolai that he was the one who told Monty to trust Kostya in the first place. Monty walks out, leaving Kostya to be killed by the Russian mobsters.

Monty returns to his apartment and apologizes to Naturelle for mistrusting her. He then hands Doyle over to Jacob in the park. He admits that he is terrified of being raped in prison, whereupon he asks Frank to beat him, believing that he might have a chance at survival if he enters the prison ugly. Frank refuses, and Monty goads Frank into taking out his frustrations, leaving Monty bruised and bloody, with a broken nose.

Naturelle tries to comfort him as Monty's father arrives to take him to Federal Correctional Institution, Otisville. On the drive to prison, Monty once again sees a parade of faces from the streets of the city. As they drive up the turnpike, James suggests they take the George Washington Bridge to go west, into hiding, and gives Monty a vision of a future where he avoids imprisonment, reunites with Naturelle, starts a family, and grows old. When the vision stops, they are past the bridge, still driving towards prison.

Cast

Production

Development
Benioff completed the book The 25th Hour while studying at the University of California Irvine, and it was published in 2001. Six months before the book's publication a preliminary trade copy was circulated which Tobey Maguire read, and he was interested in playing the role of Monty Brogan. He acquired the option for a potential film project and asked Benioff to adapt it into a screenplay. However, after the script was written, Maguire became pre-occupied with the Spider-Man film and had to abandon the plan, although he would later act as a producer on the film that was made.  Spike Lee then expressed an interest in directing the film.  

Spike Lee was interested in the long monologue that Benioff called the "fuck monologue" whereby Monty ranted against the five boroughs of New York; Benioff had considered leaving it out as he thought it might not be dramatic, and Lee persuaded Benioff to keep it in. Disney picked up the film rights and wanted the monologue cut, but Lee filmed the scene nonetheless.

The film was in the "planning stages" at the time of the September 11 attacks, and so Lee "decided not to ignore the tragedy but to integrate it into his story".

Reception
25th Hour received a 79% rating on Rotten Tomatoes based on 175 reviews, with an average rating of 7.22/10. The consensus calls the film "an intelligent and well-acted film despite the usual Spike Lee excesses." On Metacritic it has a score of 68/100 based on reviews from 40 critics, indicating “generally favorable reviews”. Audiences surveyed by CinemaScore gave the film a grade B− on scale of A to F.

Five years after the September 11 attacks, Mick LaSalle of the San Francisco Chronicle wrote: "Released 15 months after Sept. 11, 2001, Spike Lee's 25th Hour is the only great film dealing with the Sept. 11 tragedy... 25th Hour is as much an urban historical document as Rossellini's Open City, filmed in the immediate aftermath of the Nazi occupation of Rome".

Film critic Roger Ebert added the film to his "Great Movies" list on December 16, 2009. A. O. Scott, Richard Roeper and Roger Ebert all placed it on their respective lists for best films of the decade. It was named the 26th greatest film since 2000 in a 2016 BBC poll of 177 critics.

Monty's monologue, or rant, has made many top movie rant lists.

Music
Terence Blanchard composed the film's musical score. Other songs that appear in the film (and are not included in the original score) include:

 Big Daddy Kane – "Warm It Up, Kane"
 Craig Mack – "Flava in Ya Ear"
 The Olympic Runners – "Put the Music Where Your Mouth Is"
 Grandmaster Melle Mel – "White Lines (Don't Don't Do It)"
 Liquid Liquid – "Cavern"
 Cymande – "Bra"
 Cymande – "Dove"
 Cymande – "The Message"
 Bruce Springsteen – "The Fuse"

In popular culture
The Better Call Saul season 1 episode "Bingo" makes both visual and verbal references to the film and its source novel, as well as to The Simpsons. Jimmy tells Kim to "Picture The 25th Hour, starring Ned and Maude Flanders", when he phones Kim to tell her the Kettlemans, one of whom is facing jail time, have hired him to replace Kim as their attorney.

See also
 List of cultural references to the September 11 attacks
 List of hood films

References

External links

 
 

2002 films
2002 drama films
American drama films
Films scored by Terence Blanchard
Films about drugs
Films based on the September 11 attacks
Films based on American novels
Films directed by Spike Lee
Films produced by Tobey Maguire
Films set in New York City
Films set in 2002
40 Acres and a Mule Filmworks films
Touchstone Pictures films
Films with screenplays by David Benioff
Films produced by Jon Kilik
Films about scandalous teacher–student relationships
2000s English-language films
2000s American films